Coryton Power Station is a 732 MW Combined Cycle Gas Turbine (CCGT) gas-fired power station at Coryton, Thurrock, Essex, UK.

History
The site was part of the Coryton Refinery before its closure in 2012. Owned by Intergen, Coryton Power Station was built by Bechtel between 2000 and 2002, and cost £470 million. It was commissioned in 2002 and is run by Coryton Energy Ltd.

In January 2023, the power station was purchased by the Czech Creditas investment group from InterGen.

Specification
It is a CCGT type power station that uses natural gas. Gas is supplied to the site through a 7 km underground pipeline from an off-take from the National Grid Gas National Transmission System south of Stanford-le-Hope. It has two ABB Alstom GT26 gas turbines driving two electricity generators. Gas turbine exhaust gas is led to two heat recovery steam generators. These power one steam turbine, connected to a further generator. The station connects to the electricity National Grid at the nearby 400 kV Coryton South substation.

Gateway Energy Centre
Gateway Energy Centre is a proposed 1250 MW gas-turbine power station to be located on the London Gateway Logistics Park about 1 km west of Coryton power station. It will be either a gas-fired 2 × CCGT plant; a 1 × CCGT plus 1 × Open Cycle Gas Turbine (OCGT) facility, and/or a 320 MW battery energy storage system. It will be developed by InterGen. Original consent was granted in 2011, with subsequent revisions and consents granted in 2014 and 2016. CO2 capture facilities will be installed if mandated. Construction is likely to start in 2022 with commercial operation expected in 2024.

In 2020 InterGen gained consent for a 640 MWh lithium-ion battery storage power station near the site, capable of delivering 320 MW for nearly 2 hours. The £200 million project is expected start in 2022 and become operational in 2024.

See also

 Spalding Power Station

References

External links

 Intergen
 Gazette article

Natural gas-fired power stations in England
Buildings and structures in Essex
Power stations in the East of England
Power stations on the River Thames